The 2022 TCR Taiwan Series, officially called the TCR Chinese Taipei Series, is the first season of the TCR Taiwan Series. All rounds are to be held at the same venue, Lihpao Racing Park, and started on 29th April 2022 and is set to end on 30th October 2022. Each race lasts one hour.

Entry List

Calendar

Results

Championship Standings 

Scoring system

There were two different point systems used depending on the driver's class.

Drivers' Championship

References

External links 

Taiwan
TCR
TCR